Misamis was a province of the Philippines located in Mindanao. Originally a Spanish-era district, became a chartered province on May 15, 1901 (Philippine Commission Act 128). The province was dissolved in 1929.

History

Misamis takes its name from an old settlement at the mouth of the Panguil Bay once populated by Subanen, now the city of Ozamiz. Misamis is believed derived from the term kuyamis, a term for a sweet variety of coconut. However, as a result of continued raids by Moros from Lanao, the Subanens retreated into the interior and Visayan and Bukidnon settlers occupied the coast. Misamis was part of the province of Cebu until it was made into separate corregimiento in the late 18th century. By 1818, Misamis was organized as a province covering the region from Dapitan in the west, up to Gingoog in the east and as far as Cotabato and Lanao del Sur in the south. Effective control, however, was limited to the coast.

For most of the 17th and 18th centuries, Misamis remained vulnerable to the Moro slave raiders. Forts were constructed, the principal ones being in Misamis (Fuerte de la Concepcion y del Triunfo), Iligan and Cagayan de Misamis. The population of Misamis gradually increased during the 19th century due  largely to the influx of settlers from Cebu and Bohol.

Misamis used to be a part of Cebu. In 1818, it became a "corregimiento" made up of four "partidos" or divisions: Partido de Misamis, Partido de Dapitan, Partido de Cagayan and Partido de Catarman. During the latter part of the 19th century, Misamis was one of the six districts of Mindanao and, later, one of the seven districts in Mindanao and Sulu at the close of the Spanish era with Cagayan de Misamis (now Cagayan de Oro) as its capital. When it was still a part of the district of Cebu, there were twelve Spaniards and nine Filipinos who successively served as "governadore" with Mayor Carabello as the first governor in 1874.

In 1917, following the organization of the Department of Mindanao and Sulu, the province of Misamis lost the territory of Iligan to the province of Lanao. In 1939, the Philippine Legislature passed Act No. 3777 creating the provinces of Misamis Occidental and Misamis Oriental.

List of former governors

See also
Misamis Occidental
Misamis Oriental
Iligan City
Legislative districts of Misamis

References 

Former provinces of the Philippines
States and territories established in 1901
States and territories disestablished in 1929
1901 establishments in the Philippines
1929 disestablishments in the Philippines
History of Misamis Occidental
History of Misamis Oriental
History of Bukidnon
History of Camiguin